Henry Morris (by 1536 – will proved 1573), of Devizes, Wiltshire, was an English politician.

He was a Member (MP) of the Parliament of England for Devizes in 1558.

References

1573 deaths
People from Devizes
English MPs 1558
Year of birth uncertain